The Ministry of Information and Broadcasting Services is a ministry in Zambia. It is headed by the Minister of Information and Broadcasting Services.

The ministry controls two publicly owned newspapers, the Times of Zambia and the Zambia Daily Mail, and has a seat on the board of the Zambia National Broadcasting Corporation.

History
The Information and Broadcasting Services portfolio was combined with Tourism during the 1960s before the two were split.

List of ministers

Deputy ministers

References

External links
Official website

Information
 
Zambia
Mass media in Zambia
Broadcasting in Zambia
Information ministers